Anilios pilbarensis is a species of snake in the Typhlopidae family.

References

pilbarensis
Reptiles described in 1993
Snakes of Australia